Thomas Insuk Hong (born July 2, 1997) is an American short track speed skater. He competed in the 2018 Winter Olympics.

Early life and education 
Hong was born in Seoul, South Korea to parents Hang Jung and DooPyeo Hong. Hong immigrated to the United States as a child. He was raised in Laurel, Maryland and graduated from Atholton High School. He currently attends University of Maryland, College Park.

Hong speaks Korean and English.

References

1997 births
Living people
American male short track speed skaters
American people of South Korean descent
American sportspeople of Korean descent
Atholton High School alumni
Four Continents Short Track Speed Skating Championships medalists
Olympic short track speed skaters of the United States
People from Laurel, Maryland
Short track speed skaters at the 2012 Winter Youth Olympics
Short track speed skaters at the 2018 Winter Olympics
Speed skaters from Seoul
21st-century American people